Isaac Fitzgerald is an American writer and author, best known for his 2022 memoir Dirtbag, Massachusetts. He was born in Boston but spent much of his childhood in Athol, Massachusetts. Fitzgerald is a frequent guest on The Today Show where he shares book recommendations.

He joined The Rumpus, a literary magazine, as the first employee in 2009, 10 months after Stephen Elliott founded the publication. There he published essays by writers such as Roxane Gay and Cheryl Strayed. After four years at The Rumpus, he moved to publishing house McSweeney's to be the director of publicity. In 2013, he became the first book editor at BuzzFeed, where he also hosted a live morning show, "AM to DM," with writer and poet Saeed Jones.

Fitzgerald is also the author of the children's book How to Be a Pirate. Fitzgerald is based in Brooklyn, New York.

Pen & Ink and Knives & Ink 

Fitzgerald has published two books about tattoos, both of which he co-wrote with the illustrator Wendy MacNaughton. The books describe the stories behind people's tattoos, collected and edited by Fitzgerald, with MacNaughton drawing illustrations of these tattoos. 

Michigan Quarterly Review described Pen & Ink: Tattoos and the Stories Behind Them (2014) as "a strikingly illustrated, curated showcase of tattoos," whose backstories "detail heartrending tragedies, funny accidents, and all manner of circumstances in between."

Fitzgerald and MacNaughton published a sequel in 2016, Knives & Ink: Chefs and the Stories Behind Their Tattoos.

Dirtbag, Massachusetts 

Fitzgerald's memoir, Dirtbag, Massachusetts, describes his tumultuous upbringing in the small town of Athol, in western Massachusetts. He writes about his use of drugs and alcohol from an early age, his time at Cushing Academy and later George Washington University, from which he graduated in 2005. The book goes on to explore his early adulthood, including his move to San Francisco, his work as a bartender, pornography actor, and volunteering for a missionary group, Free Burma Rangers, in Thailand and Myanmar. The book appeared on the Publishers Weekly bestseller list in August 2022.

The memoir consists of a collection of essays, not all of which are in chronological order. The Boston Globe reviewed the book positively, describing its stories as "worth hearing and thinking about, even if, like life, it's sometimes messy and out of order."

A review of Dirtbag, Massachusetts in The New York Times described the book as being "about the ways men struggle to make sense of themselves and the romance men too often find in the bottom of a bottle of whiskey," comparing it to works by Jack Kerouac, Charles Bukowski, Richard Price, and Pete Hamill. The San Francisco Chronicle called the book "painfully honest but sincerely funny," and that his stories "resonate as a modern look at what it’s like to feel lost in America."

Works

References 

American writers

Year of birth missing (living people)
Living people